Tatari (Estonian for "Tatar") is a subdistrict in the district of Kesklinn (Midtown), Tallinn, the capital of Estonia. It has a population of 2,098.

Landmarks and institutions
Estonian Academy of Music and Theatre (Rävala pst 16)
Cinema "Kosmos" (Pärnu mnt 45)

Gallery

References

Subdistricts of Tallinn
Kesklinn, Tallinn